John George "Johnny" Simpson (18 March 1922 – 17 November 2010) was a New Zealand rugby union player. During his career he played as a prop.

Simpson started his footballing career playing rugby league for the Marist club in the Auckland Rugby League competition.

References

External links
All Blacks Profile

1922 births
2010 deaths
New Zealand rugby union players
Rugby union props
New Zealand international rugby union players
New Zealand rugby league players
Marist Saints players
New Zealand Army personnel
New Zealand people of World War II
Ponsonby RFC players
Rugby union players from Rotorua